Lime Creek may refer to:

Populated places
 Lime Creek Township, Cerro Gordo County, Iowa
Lime Creek Township, Washington County, Iowa
 Lime Creek, Minnesota

Streams
 Lime Creek (Winnebago River)
 Lime Creek (Des Moines River)

Other uses
 Lime Creek Observatory

See also
 Lime Kiln Creek
 Lime Ridge (disambiguation)
 Lime (disambiguation)